Owl River may refer to:

 Owl River (Manitoba), Canada
 Owl River, Alberta, Canada

See also
 Owl Creek (disambiguation)